Vladimir Alekseyevich Khubulov (born 2 March 2001) is a Russian football player who plays for FC Khimki on loan from PFC Krylia Sovetov Samara.

Club career
He made his debut in the Russian Football National League for FC Alania Vladikavkaz on 9 September 2020 in a game against FC Irtysh Omsk.

On 15 July 2022, Khubulov signed a four-year contract with PFC Krylia Sovetov Samara. He made his Russian Premier League debut for Krylia Sovetov on 16 July 2022 against FC Orenburg. On 22 February 2023, Khubulov joined FC Khimki on loan until the end of the season.

Issues 
In July 2021 Russian tennis player Daria Kasatkina published a screenshot of the Instagram direct messages, where Vladimir rudely makes claims to her for the lost match. The media suggested that player bet on Kasatkina win and was very upset.

Career statistics

References

External links
 
 Profile by Russian Football National League
 

2001 births
Sportspeople from Vladikavkaz
Living people
Russian footballers
Russia youth international footballers
Association football forwards
FC Akhmat Grozny players
FC Zenit Saint Petersburg players
PFC Krylia Sovetov Samara players
FC Khimki players
Russian First League players
Russian Premier League players